The katuali or flat-tail sea snake (Laticauda schistorhyncha) is a species of venomous sea snake in the family Elapidae. The species is found only in the waters of the Pacific Islands nation of Niue.

Description
It has a fin-like tail, helping it to swim better.

Habitat
The katuali lives most of its adult life in the sea.

Reproduction
During mating, the male katuali wraps itself around the female until she is fertilized. Because the eggs would not survive in water, the female swims into a sea cave to lay the eggs in dry crevices.  These eggs take six months to hatch, and then the infant snakes make their way to the ocean.

References

Further reading
Günther A (1874). "A Contribution to the Fauna of Savage Island". Proc. Zool. Soc. London 1874: 295-297 + Plate XLV. (Platurus schistorhynchus, new species, p. 297 + Plate XLV, figure B). 
Heatwole, Harold; Grech, Alana; Marsh, Helene (2017). "Paleoclimatology, Paleogeography, and the Evolution and Distribution of Sea Kraits (Serpentes; Elapidae; Laticauda)". Herpetological Monographs 31 (1): 1–17.

Laticauda
Fauna of Niue
Reptiles described in 1874
Taxa named by Albert Günther
Taxobox binomials not recognized by IUCN